The 2010 FIBA Europe Under-16 Championship for Women Division C was the 6th edition of the Division C of the FIBA U16 Women's European Championship, the third tier of the European women's under-16 basketball championship. It was played in Andorra la Vella, Andorra, from 26 to 31 July 2010. Scotland women's national under-16 basketball team won the tournament.

Participating teams

First round

Group A

Group B

Playoffs

Final standings

References

2010
2010–11 in European women's basketball
FIBA U16
Sports competitions in Andorra la Vella
FIBA